Radyyon Zhuk (born 6 March 1983) is a Belarusian former professional footballer.

External links

1983 births
Living people
Belarusian footballers
Association football goalkeepers
FC Shakhtyor Soligorsk players
FC Starye Dorogi players
FC Neman Grodno players
FC Smorgon players
FC Granit Mikashevichi players
FC Slutsk players